The men's 4×200 metre freestyle relay competition of the swimming events at the 2011 World Aquatics Championships was held on July 29 with the heats and final.

Records
Prior to the competition, the existing world and championship records were as follows.

Results

Heats
16 nations participated in 3 heats.

Final
The final was held at 19:41.

References

External links
2011 World Aquatics Championships: Men's 4×200 metre freestyle relay entry list , from OmegaTiming.com; retrieved 2011-07-23.
FINA World Championships, Swimming: Ryan Lochte's Monster Anchor Leg Secures United States Victory in 800 Free Relay, Swimming World Magazine (2011-07-29); retrieved 2011-08-09.

Freestyle relay 4x200 metre, men's
World Aquatics Championships